The 2010–11 season was Coventry City's 91st season in The Football League and their 10th consecutive season in the Football League Championship, giving them the second longest consecutive run in the division, behind only Preston North End. In addition to the Championship, The Sky Blues also entered the League Cup in the First Round, where they were eliminated and the FA Cup in the Third Round where they went on to be eliminated in the Fourth Round.

Review and events

Monthly events
This is a list of the significant events to occur at the club during the 2010–11 season, presented in chronological order. This list does not include transfers, which are listed in the transfers section below, or match results, which are in the results section.

June:
 3 – The Ricoh Arena is announced as a venue for Olympic football matches during the 2012 Summer Olympics.
 4 – Goalkeeper Michael Quirke signs his first professional contract, a one-year deal running until June 2011.
 16 – Coventry City draw Morecambe away in the League Cup First Round.
 17 – Coventry City's fixtures for the 2010–11 Championship season are announced

July:
 19 – Coventry City announce the new squad numbers for the forthcoming season.
 24 – Lee Carsley is named new club captain for the 2010–11 season, taking over from Stephen Wright.

August:
 9 – Freddy Eastwood is named in the Official Football League Championship team of the week, following his performance against Portsmouth.
 10 – Jonson Clarke-Harris, aged 16 years and 20 days becomes youngest player to ever appear for The Sky Blues, as a substitute against Morecambe in the League Cup.
 13 – Shaun Jeffers is called up to the England Under-19 squad for the first time for the match against Slovakia Under-19.
 23 – Ben Turner is named in the Official Football League Championship team of the week, following his performance against Derby County.

September:
 2 – Shaun Jeffers wins his first England Under-19 cap in a friendly against Slovakia Under-19.
 8 – Martyn Pert is appointed new Coventry City Assistant Manager.

October:
 29 – Midfielder Conor Thomas signs his first professional contract, a three-year deal running until 2013.

November:
 1 – Keiren Westwood is named in the Official Football League Championship team of the week, following his performance against Sheffield United.
 11 – Aidy Boothroyd is nominated for the Football League Championship Manager of the Month for October.
 28 – Coventry City draw Crystal Palace at home in the FA Cup Third Round.
 29 – James McPake and Gary McSheffrey are named in the Official Football League Championship team of the week, following their performances against Scunthorpe United.

December:
 6 – Keiren Westwood and James McPake are named in the Official Football League Championship team of the week, following their performances against Middlesbrough.
 21 – The Ricoh Arena is announced as a venue for the 2011 FA Women's Cup.
 23 – Defender Ben Turner signs a new three-and-a-half-year contract, running until Summer 2014.

January:
 9 – Coventry City draw Birmingham City away in the FA Cup Fourth Round.

February:
 7 – Jordan Clarke and Nathan Cameron are called up to the England Under-20 squad for the first time for the match against France Under-20.
 10 – Jordan Clarke and Nathan Cameron win their first caps for England Under-20 in a friendly against France Under-20.

March:
 10 – Midfielder Gary McSheffrey has a one-year contract extension activated, running until June 2012.
 11 – Michael Quirke is called up to the Republic of Ireland Under-21 squad for the first time for the match against Portugal Under-21.
 14 – Manager Aidy Boothroyd and Assistant Manager Martyn Pert are relieved of managerial duties with immediate effect.
 14 – First Team Coach Steve Harrison and Chief Scout Andy Thorn are placed in caretaker charge of first team duties.
 25 – Coventry City confirm that they are under a Football League transfer embargo, due to not making full payments on debt owed.
 25 – Michael Quirke wins his first cap for Republic of Ireland Under-21 in a friendly against Portugal Under-21.
 28 – Chairman Ray Ranson resigns and is replaced by SISU representative Ken Dulieu.

April:
4 – Keiren Westwood wins South Wales Supporters' Club's Player of the Season Award for 2010/2011.
8 – Striker Clive Platt has a one-year contract extension activated, running until June 2012.
18 – Marlon King is named in the Official Football League Championship team of the week, following his performances against Portsmouth and Millwall.
19 – Keiren Westwood wins Irish Supporters' Club Player of the Season Award for 2010/2011.
20 – Richard Keogh wins London Supporters' Club Player of the Season Award for 2010/2011.
28 – Former Chief Scout and current Caretaker Manager Andy Thorn is appointed as permanent Coventry City Manager.
29 – Strikers Shaun Jeffers and Callum Wilson sign new two-year contract extensions running until June 2013.

May:
2 – Gary McSheffrey wins Coventry City Supporters' Club Player of the Season Award for 2010/2011.
3 – Ben Turner wins Coventry City Former Players Association Player of the Year Award for 2010/2011.
5 – Marlon King is nominated for the Football League Championship Player of the Month, for the month of April.
3 – Carl Baker wins Community Player of the Season Award for 2010/2011.
3 – Lukas Jutkiewicz wins Young Player of the Season Award for 2010/2011.
3 – Gary McSheffrey wins Goal of the Season Award for 2010/2011 for his strike against Burnley.
3 – Marlon King wins Top Scorer Award for 2010/2011.
3 – Richard Keogh wins Players' Player of the Season Award for 2010/2011.
3 – Marlon King wins Fans' Player of the Season Award for 2010/2011.
3 – Jimmy Hill wins Outstanding Achievement Award at 2010/2011 ceremony.
19 – Coventry City announce the Football League transfer embargo has been lifted.
 27 – Goalkeeper Lee Burge and Defender Cyrus Christie sign their first professional contracts, a one-year deals running until June 2012.
27 – Defender Jordan Clarke signs a new three-year contract extension running until June 2014.

Squad details

Players info

Matches

Pre-season friendlies

Championship

League Cup

FA Cup

Championship data

League table

Results summary

Round by round

Season statistics

Starts and goals

|}
Notes:
 Player substitutions are not included.

Goalscorers

Assists

Yellow cards

Red cards

Captains

Penalties Awarded

Suspensions served

Monthly & Weekly Awards

End of Season Awards

Overall

Transfers

Transfers in

Transfers out

Loans in

Loans out

Trials

Kit profile

|
|
|}

References

External links
 Official Site: 2010/2011 Fixtures & Results
 BBC Sport – Club Stats
 Soccerbase – Results | Squad Stats | Transfers

Coventry City
Coventry City F.C. seasons